Governor Mountain is a mainly ice-free mountain,  high, at the west side of the head of Tomilin Glacier, in the Wilson Hills of Antarctica. It was mapped by the United States Geological Survey Topo West party, 1962–63. The mountain was occupied as a survey station by the Northern Party of the New Zealand Geological Survey Antarctic Expedition, 1963–64, which named it for Sir Bernard Fergusson, Governor-General of New Zealand, and because of the dominating aspect of this feature.

References

Mountains of Oates Land